Glucagon-like peptide-1 receptor agonists, also known as GLP-1 receptor agonists (GLP-1-RA), incretin mimetics, or GLP-1 analogs, are agonists of the GLP-1 receptor. This class of medications is used for the treatment of type 2 diabetes. One of their advantages over older insulin secretagogues, such as sulfonylureas or meglitinides, is that they have a lower risk of causing hypoglycemia. GLP-1 has a short duration of action, so to overcome this limitation several modifications in either the drugs or the formulations are being developed. The 2022 ADA standards of medical care in diabetes include GLP-1-RA as a first line pharmacological therapy for type 2 diabetes, specifically in patients with atherosclerotic cardiovascular disease or obesity.

Some GLP-1 receptor agonists have been used off-label for obesity.

Health effects
A 2021 meta-analysis found a 12% reduction in all-cause mortality when GLP-1 analogs are used in the treatment of type 2 diabetes, as well as significant improvements in cardiovascular and renal outcomes. A JAMA article meta-analysis in 2018 (covering studies concerning GLP-1 agonists, DPP-4 inhibitors, and SGLT2 inhibitors) showed GLP-1 agonists were associated with lower stroke risk than controls.

Preclinical research has suggested the possibility that the drugs may increase the risk of pancreatitis and pancreatic cancer. Analyses of human trials have not found an increased risk of pancreatitis but are insufficiently powered to rule out an effect on pancreatic cancer.

Studies in rodents have shown GLP1 mediated thyroid c-cell hyperplasia.

Approved
exenatide (brand names Byetta and Bydureon, manufactured by AstraZeneca), approved in 2005/2012
liraglutide (Victoza for diabetes, Saxenda for obesity, manufactured by Novo Nordisk), approved in 2010
albiglutide (Tanzeum, manufactured by GSK), approved in 2014
dulaglutide (Trulicity, manufactured by Eli Lilly), approved in 2014
lixisenatide (Lyxumia in Europe, Adlyxin in the United States, manufactured by Sanofi), approved in 2016
semaglutide (Ozempic and Rybelsus for diabetes, Wegovy for obesity, manufactured by Novo Nordisk), approved in 2017
tirzepatide (Mounjaro, manufactured by Eli Lilly), approved in 2022

Under investigation
taspoglutide, phase III halted Sept 2010
efpeglenatide

Mechanism
These agents work by activating the GLP-1R, rather than inhibiting the breakdown of GLP-1 as do DPP-4 inhibitors, and are generally considered more potent.

References